Paulette Lenert (born on 31 May 1968 in Luxembourg City) is a Luxembourger lawyer and politician of the Luxembourg Socialist Workers' Party. She currently holds the positions of Deputy Prime Minister, Minister of Health, Minister Delegate of Social Security, and Minister of Consumer Protection. She was Minister of Development Cooperation and Humanitarian Affairs from 5 December 2018 to 4 February 2020.

History 
After completing classical studies at the Athénée de Luxembourg, Lenert graduated in private and commercial law from the University Aix-Marseille III in 1991. Then she obtained a master's degree in European law at the University of London in 1992.

She was admitted as a lawyer to the bar of Luxembourg in 1992. In 1994, she became a justice attaché to the Ministry of Justice. From 1997 to 2010, she was the first judge and the deputy chairwoman of the Administrative Court of Luxembourg. She was the first government counsellor to the Minister of Solidarity Economy between 2010 and 2013.

In 2013, she headed the newly established Facilitation Unit for Urban Planning and Environment. Following the 2013 cabinet reshuffles, she joined the Ministry of the Civil Service as a first government councillor. She became the general coordinator of the ministry in 2014. In addition, she was appointed as an executive to the National Institute for Public Administration. She resigned from these offices when she joined the government.

On 5 December 2018, after the general election, Lenert became the Minister of Development Cooperation and Humanitarian Affairs and Minister of Consumer Protection within the coalition ministry made by the Democratic Party, the Luxembourg Socialist Workers' Party and The Greens.

On 4 February 2020, following the resignation of Etienne Schneider, Lenert became Minister of Health. Franz Fayot took over the Ministry of Development Cooperation and Humanitarian Affairs on the same date.

She lives in Mondorf-les-Bains in southeastern Luxembourg.

References 

Women government ministers of Luxembourg
Deputy Prime Ministers of Luxembourg
Luxembourg Socialist Workers' Party politicians
20th-century Luxembourgian judges
Women judges
Paul Cézanne University alumni
Alumni of the University of London
1968 births
People from Luxembourg City
Living people
Alumni of the Athénée de Luxembourg
21st-century Luxembourgian judges